This is a list of public holidays in Malawi.

Where the relevant event falls on a non-working day, the holiday is on the next working day.

References

Events in Malawi
Malawi
Malawi